No. 104 Helicopter Squadron  (Pioneer Rotarians) is a fighter squadron and is equipped with Mil Mi-35 and based at Suratgarh Air Force Station.

History
The acquisition of Sikorsky S-55 in 1954 heralded the creation of the first Helicopter Flight within the IAF, and in 1958 become established as the first dedicated Helicopter Unit, No. 104 Helicopter Squadron.

The IAF S-55s were later phased out in 1966 inducting other helicopter types into service, such as the Mil Mi-35 model in 1990.

Assignments
Indo-Pakistani War of 1965
1971 JVP insurrection
Indo-Pakistani War of 1971

Aircraft

References

104